Oliver Barrett may refer to:

 Oliver Barrett IV, a character in the 1970 film Love Story
 Oliver O'Connor Barrett (1908–1989), British sculptor, poet and composer.
 Oliver R. Barrett (1873–1950), American lawyer, author, and collector of Abraham Lincoln artifacts
 Oliver L. Barrett (1892–1943), American sculptor

See also
 Oliver Barrett House, North East, New York, United States